The Ford C-Max (stylized as Ford C-MAX and previously called the Ford Focus C-Max) is a car produced by the Ford Motor Company from 2003 to 2019. It has a five-door compact multi-purpose vehicle (MPV) design. The Ford Grand C-Max has a longer wheelbase.

Ford introduced the C-Max in the United States as its first hybrid-only line of vehicles, which includes the C-Max Hybrid, released in September 2012, and the C-Max Energi plug-in hybrid, launched in October 2012. Although the C-Max was initially available only in Europe, the first generation was partially available in New Zealand.

First generation (2003) 

The Ford Focus C-Max is preceded by the eponymous show car, which was designed by Daniel Paulin and unveiled at the 2002 Paris Motor Show.

C-Max Mk I was the first product to use the Ford C1 platform, also used by the Ford Focus Mk II and the compact MPV Premacy/Mazda5. Its internal code name is C214.

It seats five passengers and has a large amount of cargo space, which can be increased by folding the rear seats flat. Some models feature diagonally sliding outer rear seats. It also shares the control blade independent rear suspension from the Focus.

Engines and transmissions
The available four-cylinder engines are the same as the Focus.
1.6 L Duratec was the basic engine for C-Max, 1.6 L Ti-VCT Duratec was also available.
1.8/2.0 L Duratec HE are the rest of available petrol engines
1.8 L Ford flexifuel, aka 1.8f, was a flexible-fuel hybrid engine sourced from Volvo B4204S5 able to run on gasoline and ethanol (E85). Ethanol added about 25 hp extra for a total 125hp, although with higher consumption 
1.8/2.0 L Duratec HE are the rest of available petrol engines
1.6/2.0 L Duratorq Ford/PSA made diesels were available along with Ford's 1.8 L Endura engine which is upgraded and named Duratorq

*Overboost

Transmissions mated with engines are Ford IB5 (1.6/1.8 Duratec), Ford Durashift (2.0 Duratorq), MTX-75 (2.0 Duratec / 1.6-1.8 Duratorq) manual and Ford Powershift double-clutch transmission available with 2.0 Duratorq. The 4F27E mated with the 2.0 Duratec engine. A CVT automatic was also available

Facelift
In December 2006, the facelifted version of the C-Max was revealed at the 2006 Bologna Motor Show and went on sale in late spring 2007. The pre-facelift version of the car (2003–2007) was called the Ford Focus C-Max. The name change to C-Max is attributable to Ford's MPV strategy of creating a 'Max' branded line of MPVs, starting with the Ford S-Max, launched in 2006.

The facelift brought the car in line with Ford's 'Kinetic Design' design language, evidenced through its twin trapezoidal grilles, large wheel arches and angular headlights. However, as the car does not have a bodyshell originally designed for 'Kinetic Design,' Ford officially states that the car contains only 'elements' of the design language.

Second generation (2011)

Alongside the third generation Ford Focus Mk III, the second generation C-Max (C344) is built on Ford's new Global C platform. The appearance is inspired by the Iosis Max concept, shown at the 2009 Geneva Motor Show. In addition, Ford added a long wheelbase, seven-seat minivan variant of the C-Max, the Ford Grand C-Max.

The vehicle was unveiled at the 2009 Frankfurt Motor Show. Early European models include 5 seats, and 7-seat models entered the market at the end of 2010 (except Russia, where there is only the 7-seat model). At the 2011 North American International Auto Show, Ford announced a 7-seat C-MAX for the North American market. However, this model was cancelled prior to launch.

Ford unveiled the Ford C-Max Energi plug-in hybrid and the C-Max Hybrid at the 2011 North American International Auto Show. Like the conventional C-Max, the C-Max Energi and Hybrid are five-seat only. They replace the Ford Escape Hybrid and Mercury Mariner Hybrid since Ford discontinued the Mercury brand after the 2011 model year and the Escape Hybrid after the 2012 year model. The C-Max is Ford's first hybrid-only line of vehicles. Both the plug-in and hybrid version designs are based on the European gasoline- and diesel-powered versions.

The C-Max Hybrid was released in the United States in September 2012 as a 2013 model year, followed by the release of the plug-in Energi version by mid October 2012.

Production of the C-Max Energi in the United States ended in September 2017, while Hybrid production ended in 2018.

Features
The new Mk III platform is the first in its class to support Torque Vectoring Control (TVC).

The redesigned C-Max features flat folding third row seats, a hands free power lift gate, rear view camera, park assist, and panoramic sunroof. HD Radio, Sirius XM, Sync, dual-zone climate control system, and navigation system come as standard or as available options on the different trim lines.

The aerodynamics (drag coefficient, cw) of the car has been improved, being 0,30 for the 5 seater and 0,32 for the Grand C-Max.

Conventional engines and transmissions
Like the previous C-Max, the new C-Max also comes with a range of petrol and diesel four-cylinder engines which are shared with the Focus:
 1.0 L Ecoboost comes available in two states of tune, alongside the 1.6 -  guises.
 1.6 L naturally aspirated Duratec Ti-VCT is available in three output levels
 1.6 L EcoBoost came in two different variants, same as in Focus
 1.5 L EcoBoost replaced the earlier 1.6 in April 2015; power and torque figures are identical to the 1.6.
 1.6 8-valve Duratorq TDCi Ford/PSA made diesels are upgraded, Ford's 1.8 L Endura engine is not available any more.
 1.5 L 16-valve Duratorq TDCi replaced the earlier 1.6 in April 2015.
 2.0 16-valve Duratorq TDCi Ford/PSA made diesels came in three different output levels; as of April 2015 this engine was overhauled and now only two versions were available.

Transmissions mated with engines are Ford IB5 (1.6 Duratec Ti-VCT), B6 (1.6 EcoBoost/1.6 Duratorq), Durashift MMT6 (2.0 Duratorq) manual and Ford Powershift double-clutch transmission available with the 2.0 Duratorq engine.

The Ford C-MAX was facelifted in 2015 and the 1.6 Ecoboost changed to the three-cylinder 1.0 Ecoboost along with the 1.6 TDCI 115PS Duratorq changing to the 1.5 TDCI single overhead cam unit.

Hybrid 
Ford developed the C-Max Hybrid with the aim to become "America’s most affordable hybrid utility vehicle."

Specifications 

The Hybrid is offered in two trims:

The SE features eco-friendly cloth seating surfaces, Ford SYNC system with A/M-F/M stereo with single-disc CD/MP3 player, USB and auxiliary input jacks, six speakers, a multi-informational gauge cluster and color display screen, keyless entry, alloy wheels, and split-folding rear bench seat, plus a security alarm.

The SEL adds leather seating surfaces, MyFord Touch with AM/FM HD Radio stereo with single-disc CD/MP3 player and USB and auxiliary input jacks, a Sony premium surround sound system, SIRIUS Satellite Radio, power dual front seats, keyless access, push-button start system, and other luxury features. For the 2017 model year, the SEL trim level on both the C-Max Hybrid and Energi will be renamed to the Titanium trim level and also all the 2017 Ford C-Max Hybrids and plug-in Energis are expected to have restyled headlights and taillights.

The Energi Plug-In Hybrid is only available in SEL trim. But for the 2017 model year the C-Max Energi is also available on the SE trim level.

EPA ratings 
However, after criticism and lawsuits about worse-than-expected real-world fuel economy, in August 2013 Ford voluntarily lowered the EPA ratings and issued customer rebates. The revised rating for the updated 2013 C-Max Hybrid is still better than the  combined rating for the Toyota Prius v. A second downward revision was made during June 2014.

Ford boosted the on-road fuel efficiency of its three 2013 model year hybrids through changes in the cars' vehicle control software in an effort to improve customer satisfaction. The upgrade was offered free of charge to existing owners of these hybrids. Some of the changes include: 
 Optimizing the use of Active Grille Shutters to reduce aerodynamic drag under more driving and temperature conditions including cold weather, during air conditioner use and when the engine coolant temperature is higher
 Reducing the electric fan speed as a function of coolant temperature to minimize the fan’s energy consumption
 Shortening engine warm-up time by up to 50% to enable electric-only driving and engine shutdown at stops sooner after cold starts
 Optimizing the climate control system to minimize use of the air conditioning compressor and reduce the energy used in cold weather operation.

Sales 
A total of 969 units were sold during September 2012, allowing the C-Max Hybrid to rank as the ninth-best selling hybrid car in the United States that month. During October, its first full month in the market, 3,182 units were sold, outselling the Prius v by more than 400 units, which had ranked as the fourth most sold hybrid in the previous months. Sales of the C-Max Hybrid also led Ford to achieve its best October hybrid sales month ever with a total of 4,612 sales, up 142% over October 2011. Ford reported that 25% of C-Max Hybrid sales took place in California, with Los Angeles and San Francisco as the top selling regional markets. A total of 10,935 C-Max Hybrids were sold during 2012, and a total of 28,056 units in 2013.

Fuel economy controversies

In December 2012, Motor Trend reported that Consumer Reports and Green Car Reports have found that the 2013 Ford C-Max Hybrid and 2013 Ford Fusion Hybrid, which share the same powertrain, do not deliver their triple  EPA ratings in real-world use.

The consumer magazine said that their overall fuel economy results are usually close to the EPA's combined-mpg estimate, and among current models tested, more than 80% fall within  margin. Ford responded in a statement, saying that, "Early C-MAX Hybrid and Fusion Hybrid customers praise the vehicles and report a range of fuel economy figures, including some reports above . This reinforces the fact that driving styles, driving conditions, and other factors can cause mileage to vary."

A few days later the Environmental Protection Agency (EPA) said it would review claims that two new Ford hybrid vehicles were not delivering the advertised 47 mpg. Linc Wehrly, Director of Light-duty Vehicle Center Compliance Division at EPA's National Vehicle and Fuel Emissions Laboratory in Ann Arbor, Michigan commented that hybrids had far more variability in miles per gallon than conventional vehicles. All vehicles are run through the same EPA fuel-efficiency test but the test is not administered by the EPA; instead the automakers conduct the test and EPA often conducts reviews. Most vehicles's real-world gas mileage is less than the EPA sticker number, and can often be 20% less than depending on speed, temperature and other factors. The EPA explained that with hybrids the gap was much wider, as high as 30%.

The problem lay with EPA's rules that allowed automakers to group similar vehicles and apply the same ratings, which Ford did with the Fusion hybrid and C-Max hybrids.

Ford Motor Co. officials said the real-world fuel-efficiency in the C-Max Hybrid depended on driving style and other factors, and that the company did not expect the car's fuel efficiency numbers to change, as they followed EPA's test guidelines. Ford said they were working closely with the EPA to determine if their hybrid vehicle testing procedures needed to be changed. They  explained that several factors could affect hybrid fuel economy more than that of regular gasoline engines, including speed (as the difference between  could produce a 7-mpg difference in fuel economy); outside temperature (the difference between  could result in a 5 mpg difference); and vehicle break-in (a 5 mpg difference could occur from the difference ).

Due to the criticism and lawsuits, in July 2013 Ford announced it would boost the on-road fuel efficiency of the C-Max and its other two 2013 hybrids through changes in the vehicle control software, in an effort to improve customer satisfaction. The carmaker voluntarily reduced the official EPA ratings in August 2013. They also announced they would issue rebates to some 32,000 C-Max owners who would be notified by mail.

After the Ford announcement, the EPA stated that it will update the test procedures used to assign fuel economy ratings to cars "to ensure that the requirements keep pace with industry trends and innovations in advanced high-efficiency vehicles." Ford used the Fusion Hybrid test to generate the fuel economy label for the C-Max Hybrid following EPA's rules. These, which date to the 1970s, specify that automakers can use the same fuel economy numbers for similar-size vehicles equipped with the same engines and transmissions. The EPA requires automakers to test the fuel economy of the biggest-selling model in a specific category. In its midsize hybrid class, Ford tested the Fusion sedan version because it was the top seller, and Ford was allowed to apply the  achieved with the Fusion Hybrid in combined, city and highway driving to the C-Max hybrid. Ford has no plans to change the fuel economy ratings on the 2013 Fusion hybrid.

Plug-in hybrid 

The C-Max Energi plug-in hybrid started at  including the destination fee.

Specifications 
The C-Max Energi was designed with total  in hybrid mode delivered by a 2.0-liter Atkinson cycle four-cylinder gasoline engine plus an electric motor powered by a 7.6 kWh lithium-ion battery pack, which is smaller and lighter than nickel–metal hydride batteries used in previous Ford generation hybrids.

The C-Max Energi uses a regenerative braking system capable of capturing and reusing more than 95% of the braking energy normally lost during the braking process. The charging time for the C-Max Energi is 7 hours with a 120 volt charger, and 2.5 hours with a 240 volt charger. The charge port has an LED light ring like the Ford Focus Electric and is located on the driver’s side and near the front of the car. The light ring illuminates to indicate charge status. The battery is covered by an eight years or  component warranty.

Ford equipped the C-Max Energi with a button mounted in the center stack that enables drivers to choose an electric-only driving mode, and allows the driver to switch vehicle operation between three modes: electric-only driving without gasoline engine power ("EV Now" setting); normal hybrid mode where the powertrain blends electric and gasoline engine power as appropriate ("EV Auto" setting); or a battery-saving mode that reserves the battery power for later use ("EV Later" setting). Like the Ford Fusion Hybrid, the C-Max Energi comes with a SmartGauge with EcoGuide that provides in-vehicle customizable displays, including instantaneous fuel economy readings and coaching functions to help drivers understand and optimize their fuel efficiency. The plug-in hybrid also features ECO Cruise which saves energy by relaxing acceleration compared to standard cruise control.

EPA ratings 

Ford designed the C-Max Energi plug-in hybrid to deliver better miles per gallon equivalent (MPG-e) in all-electric mode than the Toyota Prius Plug-in Hybrid. Initially, the EPA rated the Energi combined city/highway fuel economy in all-electric mode at 100 MPG-e. Later, when owners complained of not achieving the sticker fuel economy, and following a technical review, the official EPA rating in EV mode was downgraded to 88 MPG-e. EPA's rating for combined EV/hybrid operation is 51 MPG-e (4.6 L gasoline equivalent/100 km), which allows the C-Max Energi to rank in sixth place, together with the Fusion Energi, among the top ten EPA-Rated Fuel Sippers since 1984.

Sales 

Ford released the C-Max Energi in the U.S. market by mid October 2012, and during that month 144 units were delivered to U.S. retail customers, and ended with 2,374 units delivered in 2012. The C-Max Energi ranked as the fifth top selling plug-in electric car in the U.S. during 2013, and climbed to number fourth in 2014. Over 35,700 units have been sold in North America and Europe through December 2016, with 33,509 units delivered in the U.S. through December 2016, 967 units in Canada through December 2016, and 1,229 in the Netherlands in 2015.

C-Max Solar Energi concept 
Ford Motor Company announced the C-MAX Solar Energi concept, a solar PV-powered vehicle to run electrically without depending on the electric grid for fuel. The C-MAX Solar Energi Concept was unveiled at the 2014 International CES in Las Vegas. This is a collaborative project of Ford, SunPower Corp. and the Georgia Institute of Technology.

Production 
For the North American market, the C-Max Hybrid was assembled alongside the 2012 Focus and Ford Focus Electric at Ford's Wayne plant in Michigan. The C-Max Energi was also assembled in Michigan. Since 2015, all European versions are built in the Saarlouis Body & Assembly, Germany. Ford of Europe announced that it would end production of both the C-Max and Grand C-Max in Germany by the end of the second quarter of 2019.

Recognition
The C-Max Energi was awarded the 2012 Green Car Vision Award by the Green Car Journal at the 2012 Washington Auto Show.
Both the Ford C-Max hybrid and the Energi plug-in hybrid were among the five finalists for the 2013 Green Car of the Year awarded by the Green Car Journal at the 2012 Los Angeles Auto Show.
In Europe, the C-Max is designed with lower VOC and allergens, along with several other Ford vehicles.

See also
Ford Focus Electric
Ford Fusion Energi
Ford Fusion Hybrid
Ford B-Max
Ford I-Max
Ford S-Max

References

External links

Ford C-Max at Ford UK 
Ford C-Max Owners Club
Real world performance data on the Ford C-Max Energi, Idaho National Laboratory, December 2013

C-Max
C-Max
Euro NCAP small MPVs
Compact MPVs
Flexible-fuel vehicles
Ford C1 platform
Cars introduced in 2003
Vehicles with CVT transmission
Front-wheel-drive vehicles
Plug-in hybrid vehicles
2010s cars